Incognito is the sixth album by Spyro Gyra, released in 1982. At Billboard magazine, it reached No. 46 on the Top 200 Albums chart, and No. 2 on that magazine's Jazz Albums chart.

Track listing

Charts

U.S. Weekly charts

U.S. Year End chart

Personnel 
 Jay Beckenstein – saxophone, whistle (2)
 Tom Schuman – keyboards (1), synthesizers (1, 2, 5, 6), acoustic piano (3), electric piano (5, 6, 8)
 Jorge Dalto – acoustic piano (2)
 Rob Mounsey – synthesizers (2, 5, 6, 7), vocoder (3, 6, 7)
 Richard Tee – acoustic piano (4, 8), organ (4)
 Jeremy Wall – electric piano (7)
 Steve Love – guitar (1, 3-8), acoustic guitar (2), electric guitar (2)
 Hiram Bullock – guitar (1, 6)
 Chet Catallo – guitar textures (3), guitar (4, 8)
 John Tropea – guitar textures (3), slide guitar (4), guitar (5, 7)
 Will Lee – bass (1)
 Marcus Miller – bass (2-8)
 Steve Gadd – drums
 Manolo Badrena – congas (1), percussion (2, 5, 6, 7)
 Gerardo Velez – percussion (1, 2, 4, 8)
 Dave Samuels – marimba (2, 6, 7), vibraphone (3, 7, 8)
 Crusher Bennett – congas (5, 7)
 Toots Thielemans – harmonica (4)

Horn Section
 Tom Scott – flute, saxophone, Lyricon (5)
 Larry Williams – flute, saxophone
 Bill Reichenbach Jr. – trombone
 Gary Grant – flugelhorn, trumpet
 Jerry Hey – flugelhorn, trumpet, horn arrangements (1-4, 6, 7, 8)
 Jeremy Wall – horn arrangements (5)

String Section
 Jeremy Wall – string arrangements and conductor 
 Harry Lookofsky – concertmaster 
 Jonathan Abramowitz and Jesse Levy – cello
 Frederick Buldrini, Peter Dimirtiades, Lewis Eley, Regis Iandiorio, Harold Kohon, Harry Lookofsky, Guy Lumia, Marvin Morgenstern, Matthew Raimondi and Richard Young – violin

Production 
 Jay Beckenstein – producer 
 Richard Calandra – producer
 Michael Barry – engineer, mixing 
 Steve Crimmel – assistant engineer
 Josiah Gluck – assistant engineer
 Debbie Rebhun – assistant engineer
 Nina Siff – assistant engineer
 Larry Swist – assistant engineer
 Bob Ludwig – mastering 
 George Osaki – art direction, design 
 Michael G. Cobb – cover illustration

Studios 
 Recorded at Secret Sound (New York, NY) and Ocean Way Recording (Hollywood, CA).
 Mixed at BearTracks Studios (Suffern, NY).
 Mastered at Masterdisk (New York, NY).

References

1982 albums
Spyro Gyra albums
MCA Records albums